Abd al-Rahman Mannai (Arabic:عبد الرحمن المناعي) a playwright and director, born in Qatar in 1948, he obtained the technical Secondary School - Electricity in 1969, some specialized courses, and English language courses.

He is considered one of the founders of the theatrical movement in Qatar, where the first text he wrote was (Umm Al-Zein) in 1975, directed by Jordanian director Hani Sanubar. This play is the milestone in the history of the theatrical and artistic movement in the history of Qatar

His works 

 1975: “Umm Al-Zein”
 1976: (The rest of the testament)
 1976: “Hobil yalmal”
 1977: “Al jarima” (the Crime)
 1978:”Almoghanni wa al Amira” (the singer and the princess)
 1979: “yalil yalil” (o night o night!)
 1980: “al hidha' al dhahabi” (the golden boot)
 1982: “al fil ya malik al zaman“ (the elephant o the king of time)
 1983: “ha alshakl ya zaefran” (this shape o saffron)
 1983: “man yadhak 'akhiran” (who laughs last)
 1984: “hikayat haddad” (a tale of a smithy)
 1984: “anin alsawari” (the whine of masts)
 1987: “qitar almarah” (the joy train)
 1987: “al thaman” (the price)
 1989: “al khayma” (the tent)
 1990: “al muharij” (the clown)
 1990: “al hadith walkayin” (the accident ant the creature)
 1995: “rasayil bu'ahmad al huwayli” (Bu Ahmed AL Huwayli)
 1999: “ghinawi al shamali” (the northern Ghinawi)
 2000: “zakaria Habibi” (Zakaria my love)
 2001: “mughram hal alshawq” (this longing is in love)
 2001: “al khuyul” (the horses)
 2004: “khaymat al eizi” ( the pride tent)
 2005: “yahil al sharq” (the child of the east)
 2006: “ahl sharq” (People of the East)
 2006: “May waghilan”
 2007: “halwasat” (hallucinations)  
 2010: “asfar alzabari” (al zabari travels)
 2010: “al luwluat bayn al disha wa al qaffal” (The pearl between the beginning and end of the diving trip),  2012: “kark”, 2015: “hunak” (there)

Honors and awards 

 Best Theatrical Technique Award “al motarashiqun” (The Crossroads), Carthage Festival Second Edition Tunisia 1985
 The Cooperation Council Medal at the Muscat Summit 1989
 Honoring a theater pioneer, the second Gulf Festival, Qatar 1990
 Best Integrated Theatrical Work Award “GHinawi al shamali” (the northern Ghinawi) Sixth Gulf Festival Muscat 2000
 The Jury Appreciation Award for the play “maqamat Ben Bahr” (Ben Bahr’s shrines) Carthage Festival, third session, Tunis 1978
 Best Director Award ”Moghram Hal Al-Shawq” (this longing is in love) Seventh Gulf Festival Doha 2002
 State Appreciation Award in the field of theatrical arts for the year 2006

References 
1948 births
Living people
Qatari writers